Santahamina is an island and neighbourhood of Eastern Helsinki, Finland. At present it is a military base housing the Guard Jaeger Regiment, making access restricted. The Finnish National Defence University (NDU) is also located on the island.

Santahamina housed before 2007 a mediumwave broadcasting station used by Yle for broadcasting on 558 kHz with 100 kW.

Politics
Results of the 2011 Finnish parliamentary election in Santahamina:

National Coalition Party   45.5%
True Finns   30.6%
Social Democratic Party   7.5%
Centre Party   6.3%
Green League   3.4%
Left Alliance   3.0%
Christian Democrats   3.0%

External links

Santahamina website 

Neighbourhoods of Helsinki
Islands of Helsinki
Islands of Uusimaa